Garry Manuel (born 20 February 1950) is a former football (soccer) forward. He was a member of the  1974 World Cup squad in West Germany and represented Australia six times in total for one goal between 1969 and 1975. Manuel played for Prague and Pan Hellenic in NSW and represented the state on several occasions.

References

See also

1950 births
Living people
Australia international soccer players
Australian soccer players
1974 FIFA World Cup players
Association football forwards
Sydney FC Prague players